Sere or SERE may refer to:

Military
 Survive, Evade, Resist, Extract, a British military training program
 Survival, Evasion, Resistance and Escape, an American military training program

People
 Sere (name)
 Sere people, an ethnic group in Southern Sudan

Places
 Serè, Liege, Belgium
 Sère, Gers department, France
 Sere, Mali, a rural commune in the Tombouctou region of Mali

Other uses
 Ṣērê, a Hebrew niqqud vowel sign
 "Seré", a song by Chilean musician Nicole Natalino
 Sere (ecology), an ecological stage or event, one such event in a series
 Sere languages, a proposed family of Ubangian languages
 Sere language, spoken in northeastern Democratic Republic of the Congo
 "SERE", an episode of The Unit (season 1)

See also
 
 Sear (disambiguation)
 Seer (disambiguation)
 Seir (disambiguation)
 Serr, a surname